The Volkswagen Group MQB platform is the company's strategy for shared modular design construction of its transverse, front-engine, front-wheel-drive layout (optional front-engine, four-wheel-drive layout) automobiles. It was first introduced in the Volkswagen Golf Mk7 in late 2012. Volkswagen spent roughly $8bn developing this new platform and the cars employing it. The platform underpins a wide range of cars from the supermini class to the mid size SUV class. MQB allows Volkswagen to assemble any of its cars based on this platform across all of its MQB ready factories. This allows the Volkswagen group flexibility to shift production as needed between its different factories.  Beginning in 2012, Volkswagen Group marketed the strategy under the code name MQB, which stands for Modularer Querbaukasten, translating from German to "Modular Transversal Toolkit" or "Modular Transverse Matrix". MQB is one strategy within VW's overall MB (Modularer Baukasten or modular matrix) program which also includes the similar MLB strategy for vehicles with longitudinal engine orientation.

MQB is not a platform as such, but, rather, a system for introducing rationality to different platforms that have transverse engines, regardless of the ten body configurations the company manufactures for any of its eleven vehicle brands.  Thus MQB coordinates a core "matrix" of components across a wide variety of platforms — for example, sharing a common engine-mounting core for all drivetrains (e.g., gasoline, diesel, natural gas, hybrid and purely electric), as well as reducing weight. The concept allows different models to be manufactured at the same plant, further saving cost.

Ulrich Hackenberg, chief of Volkswagen’s Research and Development (Head of Audi Development until 2015), called MB a "strategic weapon."

Press comments 
British magazine Car said "the idea heralds a return to basic principles of mass production in an industry where over the last 100 years, complexity has spiralled out of control. By creating a standardised, interchangeable set of parts from which to build a variety of cars, (the company) plans to cut the time taken to build a car by 30%."

The car blog Jalopnik said "The biggest feature is the uniform position of all motors and transmissions" and that "by fitting all motors into the same place (the company) hope(s) to cut down on engineering costs and weight/complexity when porting the car over to other models." Around 60% of the development costs occur between gas pedal and front wheels, including the engine.

MQB-based models
MQB models range from superminis to large family cars.  The MQB architecture replaces the PQ25, PQ35 and PQ46 platforms.

All MQB cars will share the same front axle, pedal box and engine positioning, despite varying wheelbase, track and external dimensions.

First generation MQB (2012) 
The "first-generation" MQB platform underpins various vehicles from C-segment upwards.
 Audi A3 Mk3 (2013–2020)
 Audi Q2 (2016–present)
 Audi TT Mk3 (2014–present)
 SEAT León Mk3 (2012–2020)
 Škoda Octavia Mk3 (2012–2020)
 Škoda Superb Mk3 (B8) (2015–present)
 Volkswagen Arteon/CC (2017–present)
 Volkswagen Atlas / Teramont (2017–present)
Atlas Cross Sport/Teramont X (2019–present)
 Volkswagen Golf Mk7 (2012–2020)
 Volkswagen Golf Sportsvan (2014–2020)
 Volkswagen Lamando (2014–2022)
Volkswagen Passat/Magotan (B8) (2014–present)
Volkswagen Passat (China only) (2018–present)
Volkswagen Polo Mk5 (6C) (2015-present)
 Volkswagen Touran Mk2 (2015–present)

Second generation MQB (MQB Ax; 2016) 
The "second-generation" MQB debuted in 2016, which also introduces three different types of the platform grouped by size/segment. The introduction of the MQB A0 category enables the platform to be used on smaller and cheaper vehicles in the B-segment.

MQB A0 

 Audi A1 Mk2 (2018–present)
 SEAT Arona (2017–present)
 SEAT Ibiza Mk5 (2017–present)
 Škoda Kamiq (global) (2019–present)
 Škoda Scala (2019–present)
 Škoda Fabia Mk4 (2021–present)
 Volkswagen Nivus/Taigo (2020–present)
 Volkswagen Polo Mk6 (2017–present)
 Volkswagen T-Cross/Tacqua (2019–present)
 Volkswagen Virtus (2018–present)

MQB A0 IN 
A low-cost variation of the A0 platform for the Indian market was introduced in 2019 and utilized for vehicles released from 2021.
 Škoda Kushaq (2021–present)
 Škoda Slavia (2021–present)
 Volkswagen Taigun/T-Cross (2021–present)
Volkswagen Virtus / Polo Sedan (2022–present)

MQB A1 

 Jetta VS5 (2019–present)
 SEAT Ateca (2016–present)
 Škoda Karoq (2017–present)
 Volkswagen Bora Mk4 (2018–present)
 Volkswagen Jetta/Sagitar/Vento Mk7 (2018–present)
 Volkswagen Lavida Mk3 (2018–present)
 Volkswagen T-Roc (2017–present)
 T-Roc Cabriolet (2020–present)
 Volkswagen Taos/Tharu (2018–present)

MQB A2 

 Audi Q3 Mk2 (2018–present)
 Audi Q3 Sportback (2019–present)
 Jetta VS7 (2020–present)
SEAT Tarraco (2018–present)
Škoda Kodiaq (2016–present)
Kodiaq GT (2018–present)
Volkswagen Tayron (2018–present)
Tayron X (2020–present)
 Volkswagen Tiguan Mk2 (2016–present)
 Tiguan Allspace/L (2017–present)
 Tiguan X (2020–present)
Volkswagen Viloran (2020–present)

MQB Evo (2019) 

 Audi A3 Mk4 (2020–present)
 Audi Q6 (2022–present)
 SEAT León Mk4 (2020–present)
 Škoda Octavia Mk4 (2020–present)
 Volkswagen Caddy Mk4 (2020–present)
 Volkswagen Golf Mk8 (2019–present)
 Volkswagen Talagon (2021–present)
 Volkswagen Tavendor (2022–present)
 Volkswagen Transporter (T7) (2022—present)
 Cupra Formentor (2021–present)
 Ford Tourneo Connect Mk3 (2022–present)
Volkswagen Lamando L (2022–present)

See also
 Volkswagen Group MLB platform
 Volkswagen Group MSB platform
 Volkswagen Group MEB platform
 Volkswagen Group New Small Family platform
 List of Volkswagen Group platforms

References

External links

Volkswagen Group corporate website
Audi corporate website

Volkswagen Group platforms